Hadrianus Sinaga (June 15, 1912 – July 11, 1981) is the eighth minister of health of Indonesia. He was also the member of the People's Representative Council from 1950 until 1954. He was also the third general secretary of the Indonesian Christian Party. He was a surgeon, and established of the Medical Faculty of the Christian University of Indonesia.

Early life 
Hadrianus Sinaga was born in Hatoguan, Samosir Island, Dutch East Indies, on June 15, 1912. He went to the Dutch East Indies Doctors' School in Surabaya, and finished his studies in 1942.

Career 
After finishing his studies, he became a doctor in Panyabungan, South Tapanuli, and as the Head of Health Affairs of the Tapanuli Residency, the head of health affairs of the Defense Council of Tapanuli, and the head of health affairs of the People's Safety Forces.

Political career

In the Indonesian Christian Party 
From 1947 until 1949, Sinaga was chosen as the member of the Central Indonesian National Committee. He was chosen as the member of the People's Representative Council of the United States of Indonesia, and the Temporary People's Representative Council, until 8 December 1954, when he resigned.

Sinaga was chosen as the 3rd general secretary of the Indonesian Christian Party at its 3rd congress from 7–9 April 1950 in Jakarta.

As the Minister of Health 
Sinaga was chosen as the minister of health in the Second Ali Sastroamidjojo Cabinet. During his tenure he initiated the building of a regional hospital in Samosir, with the funds from UNICEF. Several years after his death, government changed the name of the hospital to his name. The street in front of the hospital was also changed to his name.

Death 
Hadrianus Sinaga died in Jakarta on July 11, 1981. He was buried at the Kalibata Heroes Cemetery in Jakarta.

References

Bibliography 

1912 births
1981 deaths
Indonesian Christians
Health ministers of Indonesia
Members of the People's Representative Council, 1950